Sperm-associated antigen 5 is a protein that in humans is encoded by the SPAG5 gene.

This gene encodes a protein associated with the mitotic spindle apparatus. The encoded protein may be involved in the functional and dynamic regulation of mitotic spindles.

References

Further reading